Podkolodnovka is a rural locality (a selo) and the administrative center of Podkolodnovskoye Rural Settlement, Bogucharsky District, Voronezh Oblast, Russia. The population was 1,582 as of 2010. There are 17 streets.

Geography 
Podkolodnovka is located on the left bank of the Don River, 11 km northeast of Boguchar (the district's administrative centre) by road. Galiyevka is the nearest rural locality.

References 

Rural localities in Bogucharsky District